Revolutionary Conquerors was a Belizean football team which currently competes in the Belize Premier Football League (BPFL) of the Football Federation of Belize. The franchise was sold and became Ilagulei FC.

The team is based in Dangriga. Their home stadium is Carl Ramos Stadium.

Revolutionary Conquerors in international competition
 1R = First round

Current squad

Coaches
 Palmero Salas

Football clubs in Belize
2005 establishments in Belize
Association football clubs established in 2005